Flesh & Blood is the thirteenth studio album by British hard rock band Whitesnake, released on 10 May 2019 through Frontiers Records. A music video was released for the lead single "Shut Up & Kiss Me". The band was slated to embark on a world tour in support of the album, but it was delayed due to the COVID-19 pandemic.

Background
David Coverdale stated that the band "put everything we had and more into making this album". U.S. musician Joel Hoekstra, who joined Whitesnake in 2015, co-wrote six of the album's tracks with Coverdale. As well, U.S. musician Reb Beach co-wrote five of the tracks.

Critical reception

Philip Wilding of Classic Rock felt that listeners "hoping that the new Whitesnake album record will recall Coverdale's smoky, Lovehunter past should look away now", but for those that "want something to listen to while driving with the top down in some steamy Californian clime, then this Whitesnake is hard to beat". Loudwire named it one of the 50 best rock albums of 2019.

Track listing

Personnel
Whitesnake
 David Coverdale – lead vocals
 Reb Beach – guitar
 Joel Hoekstra – guitar
 Michael Devin – bass guitar
 Tommy Aldridge – drums
 Michele Luppi – keyboards, vocals

Charts

References

2019 albums
Whitesnake albums
Frontiers Records albums
Glam metal albums